Rothley Imperial Football Club is a football club based in Rothley, Leicestershire England. The club's nickname is the Imps. The club is affiliated to the Leicestershire and Rutland County Football Association

History
In 2003 the club joined Division One of the Leicestershire Senior League. After winning the division in their first season, they were promoted to the Premier Division. In 2006–07 the club entered the FA Vase for the first time. They entered for the next two seasons, but only won one match, beating Pershore Town 3–2 in the second qualifying round, before losing to Dudley Town in the next round.

In 2011–12 the club won the Premier Division, and retained the title the following season. However, they resigned from the Leicestershire Senior League shortly before the end of the 2015–16 season, and subsequently folded. In 2017 the club were re-established and joined the Premier Division of the North Leicestershire League. For the 2019–20 season the club rejoined the Leicestershire Senior League, in division two.

Ground

The club play their home games at Loughborough Road. The ground has floodlights.

Honours
Leicestershire Senior League
Premier Division champions 2011–12, 2012–13
Division One champions 2003–04

Records
Best FA Vase performance: First round, 2008–09

References

External links

Football clubs in England
Football clubs in Leicestershire
Leicestershire Senior League
North Leicestershire Football League
Association football clubs established in 1911
1911 establishments in England